Bingo Duty is a tax levied on profits made from organising and promoting bingo games played in the United Kingdom, with certain exceptions.

Receipts 
From 27 October 2003 to 22 April 2009, Bingo Duty was set at 15% of gross profits. On 22 April, this was raised to 22% until 29 March 2010, when it was reduced to 20%. From 1 July 2014, Bingo Duty has been set at 10%.

References 

Taxation in the United Kingdom
Bingo
Gambling in the United Kingdom